Tristan Jarry (born April 29, 1995) is a Canadian professional ice hockey goaltender for the Pittsburgh Penguins of the National Hockey League (NHL). Jarry was selected by the Penguins in the second round (44th overall) of the 2013 NHL Entry Draft.

Playing career
Jarry started with the Edmonton Oil Kings during the 2011–12 WHL season, playing 14 games with a 0.894 save percentage. In his second season with Edmonton, Jarry played 27 games, and led all goaltenders with a 0.936 save percentage and 1.61 goals against average. In the 2013 CHL Top Prospects Game, Jarry stopped all 16 shots at him to be named Team Cherry's Player of the Game, and the following season he was named to the 2013–14 WHL Eastern Conference First All-Star Team.

Pittsburgh Penguins
On April 7, 2015, Jarry was assigned to the Wilkes-Barre/Scranton Penguins. On April 9, 2016, Jarry was called up by Pittsburgh Penguins wearing #35 when goalies Marc-André Fleury and Matt Murray were both injured. He dressed for first two games of the playoffs for Pittsburgh, then was sent back to the minors when Murray returned from injuries. On May 19, he was recalled for the rest of the season as emergency goaltender. Jarry did not qualify to be on the Cup, since he did not play for the Penguins in the 2015–16 regular season or dress in the Stanley Cup Finals.

Jarry played his first NHL preseason game on September 28, 2016, where he posted a 30-save shutout in a 2–0 victory over the Chicago Blackhawks. Despite an early-season injury to starting goalie Matt Murray, the Penguins returned Jarry to Wilkes-Barre for the start of the AHL season and instead signed Mike Condon as backup. With Jarry as the starting goaltender for the Baby Penguins he posted career numbers in 45 games with 28 wins and a 2.15 goals against average, being named to the 2017 all-star game receiving the Harry "Hap" Holmes Memorial Award, and helping Wilkes-Barre finish with the best record in the regular season. Jarry was called up to the NHL on April 9, and the next day, he made his NHL debut, starting for the Penguins in a 3–2 loss to the New York Rangers on the final game of the regular season, in a game in which Magnus Hellberg also made his first NHL start. Due to an injury to Murray, Jarry remained on the NHL roster as a backup to veteran Marc-André Fleury. Jarry dressed for 11 playoff games, until Murray return from injury. The Penguins repeated as Stanley Cup Champions. Jarry received a Stanley Cup ring from the Penguins organization, despite only playing in one NHL game. Jarry did not dress in the finals, so he could not get his name on the cup.

Jarry won his first NHL game, and got his first NHL assist, on November 25, 2017, in a 5–2 win against the Tampa Bay Lightning. He then recorded his first NHL shutout six days later on December 1, 2017, in a 4–0 win against the Buffalo Sabres. On January 24, 2018, he was reassigned to the Wilkes-Barre/Scranton Penguins, when Matt Murray returned after missing the first half of the season due to the death of his father. He was recalled on February 4, 2018, replacing Casey DeSmith as backup. On February 26, Pittsburgh recalled DeSmith, once again switching with Jarry for the backup goaltender position. However, Jarry was recalled the very next day after Murray suffered a concussion the day prior. On July 26, 2018, the Penguins re-signed Jarry to a two-year, $1.35 million contract extension worth $650,000 annually. The extension is a two-way deal in 2018–19, and a one-way deal in 2019–20.

Jarry attended the Penguins' training and development camp prior to the 2018–19 season. He was injured in the Penguins' last preseason game against the Columbus Blue Jackets on September 28 and was placed on the Penguins' injured non-roster prior to the beginning of the 2018–19 season. He was eventually assigned to the Wilkes-Barre/Scranton Penguins on October 5. Jarry recorded the first goal scored by a goaltender in Wilkes-Barre/Scranton Penguins history during a 5–1 win over the Springfield Thunderbirds on November 14, 2018. He was recalled to the NHL on November 22 after starter Matt Murray was placed on injured reserve.

On October 3, 2020, Jarry signed a three-year, $10.5 million contract extension with the Penguins. He became the primary goaltender for the Penguins after Matt Murray was traded to the Ottawa Senators and eventually helped them clinch first place in the NHL East Division during the 2020–21 NHL season. On May 24, 2021, Jarry turned over the puck in his zone and allowed Josh Bailey to score the Game 5 double overtime winner for the New York Islanders, who thus took a 3–2 series lead in the first round of the 2021 Stanley Cup playoffs. The Penguins were then eliminated in Game 6 after losing 5–3 to the Islanders; Jarry posted a .888 save percentage in the postseason.

Goaltender mask design
Displayed on Jarry's goalie mask are the Penguins of Madagascar playing pond hockey against Tom and Jerry, referencing the Pittsburgh Penguins and paying homage to his last name. Tom and Jerry was a nickname given to Jarry by previous Oil Kings teammate Kristiāns Pelšs who died in 2013.

Career statistics

Awards and honours

References

External links

1995 births
Canadian ice hockey goaltenders
Edmonton Oil Kings players
Ice hockey people from British Columbia
Living people
Pittsburgh Penguins draft picks
Pittsburgh Penguins players
Sportspeople from Surrey, British Columbia
Wilkes-Barre/Scranton Penguins players